Coniophanes joanae is a species of snake in the family Colubridae. The species is native to Panama.

References

Coniophanes
Snakes of North America
Reptiles described in 1966
Endemic fauna of Panama
Reptiles of Panama